Olivia Schneider is a fictional character on German soap opera Verbotene Liebe (Forbidden Love) portrayed by actress and singer Kristina Dörfer from 29 December 2006 to 24 September 2009.

Character's background 
Olivia is the niece of Charlie Schneider (Gabriele Metzger) and Lars Schneider (Herbert Ulrich). She comes from a small town to Düsseldorf and has the dream to become rich and famous. To obtain a job in the 'Lahnstein Holding', she charms her way in by claiming to be the girlfriend of Constantin von Lahnstein (Milan Marcus). Constantin's brother Ansgar (Wolfram Grandezka) gives her the job of the assistant. Constantin then asks her a favor for not telling his brother that he and Olivia never actually were a couple. He wants Olivia to get between and break up Andi Fritzsche (Dominic Saleh-Zaki), the new boyfriend of Lisa Brandner (Lilli Hollunder), who is Constantin's ex and who he is still in love with. Olivia agrees and makes it look like that she and Andi had sex in the elevator. When they get caught by Lisa, Olivia held her promise to Constantin. Olivia has a very complicated relationship with her aunt Charlie. Charlie could never stand her niece and knows about her little schemes. But Charlie is scared of Olivia when she comes back to Düsseldorf, because she knows a secret from her past that could destroy the relationship with her brother Lars forever. Olivia blackmails her aunt and her plan works. To hurt Charlie, she sleeps with Charlie's fiancé Bernd von Beyenbach (Ron Holzschuh), who didn't know Olivia was Charlie's niece. Olivia tells Charlie about her night with Bernd and that he was only after Charlie's money anyway. Charlie ends the relationship with Bernd and is heartbroken. Meanwhile, Andi tries to prove that he never slept with Olivia and sees his chance, when he finds out about Charlie's complicated relationship with Olivia. Charlie agrees to help Andi to discover Olivia's scheme against him and Lisa, but is once again blackmailed by her niece, when she and Andi found avedence. Charlie has no other choice and destroys everything, much to Andi's detriment.

Olivia wants to make career and begins an affair with Ansgar to have the right man on her side to do so. At this time, Ansgar is married to Nathalie (Jenny Winkler), but hasn't any problem to be seen with Olivia as his mistress. While her affair with Ansgar, Olivia begins to fall for Andi and tries to improve herself for him. But eventually, she starts her little games again and makes Andi believe that she dates a biker. Andi and Olivia get closer and sleep together, but Olivia doesn't want to lose her status and the money she gets from Ansgar. When he has enough of the affair with her, Olivia claims to be pregnant with his child. With that lie, Olivia tries to get more money out of him for an abortion, but Ansgar has other plans. He wants Olivia to give birth to the child and give it to him with relinquishment of her maternal rights. Olivia's plan gets completely out of control, when Andi thinks she is pregnant with his child and wants to be there for her. She begins to fall in love with the idea of a family with Andi and goes on with her lies. When the truth comes out, she not only loses Ansgar's money, she loses Andi too, who eventually leaves town.

After that, Olivia can finally make peace with her aunt Charlie, when her cousin Oliver Sabel (Jo Weil) returns to town. She begins to work as a waitress in Charlie's bistro, but soon sees that she wants more in her life. Olivia gets a job as assistant in the model agency of Tanja von Anstetten (Miriam Lahnstein). Charlie and Oliver try to warn her, but nobody can stop her. She soon needs to see for herself how unpredictable Tanja is, when she uses Olivia as a drug dealer for Sarah Hofmann (Sina-Valeska Jung), one of her models. But Olivia stays with Tanja and hopes that she might get her big chance one day and work as a model herself. Later on in the show, she discovers Oliver's secret relationship with Christian after a drunken night at their apartment and crashing into Christian's bed and discovers the two naked under the covers together asleep. She appears surprised, but soon swears to secrecy on the account they owe her a favor in exchange, using their secret as leverage for future blackmail. This proves true when she decides to use the boxing club as well as Christian himself for a modeling shoot, much to his and Gregor's annoyance since he had to impress a big time coach in a short while. At first Christian refuses, but when she threatens to expose his true sexuality to Gregor, who does not know about Christian being gay, he begrudgingly accepts.

Olivia's dream comes true after she proves herself several times to Tanja and gets a deal. But from the beginning Olivia seems to be a hard model to work with. At two photo shootings she presents herself as a diva and gets almost fired until she learns how to be in that job. Olivia gets another problem, when she becomes the new face of a fashion label and even takes nude photos of herself, claiming all the big stars do it. The photographer of these photos tries to blackmail her. Afraid of being fired she wants to pay him, but Oliver realizes the problems of his cousin and helps her out together with Sebastian von Lahnstein (Joscha Kiefer).

After this, Sebastian and Olivia get closer and become even something like good friends. Sebastian, who comes out of a complicated relationship with Lydia Brandner (Theresa Underberg), finds his laugh again, when he is with Olivia. She gets more and more interested in him and after the name was the first thing that was attractive to her, Olivia finds herself falling for Sebastian. But Sebastian's good behavior has a reason - another reason than a friendship. He betted with Elisabeth von Lahnstein (Martina Servatius) about Olivia's image. While Elisabeth doesn't believe that Olivia will ever be good enough for the higher class, Sebastian tries to teach her. Even hurt when she finds out about the bet, Olivia agrees to help Sebastian win it.

In her last episodes of the series, Olivia owes several people money, but refuses to take a job as a waitress again and soon finds herself on the streets, nowhere to go since no one wants her around, including Oliver. Wanting to look for a Hollywood-like job, she comes across an ad in the paper for people who wish to become Hollywood stars. However, she finds out that she needs to make a hands down $2,000 payment as an investment. She reaches out to Oliver to loan her the money, but he bluntly refuses to. After failing to convince other people as well to loan her the cash, she steals the money from Oliver and what he made at NoLimits that night and takes off with the money. She then goes for her audition, singing a song, and seems to make an impression on the man running the project and gives him the money. He promises to make her a star and she goes to NoLimits to tell everyone of her supposed success. Oliver is furious at her for stealing from him, telling her that she took more than 2 grande from him. Olivia says she'll pay him "when she becomes a star" and how she found an agent to do so, even though everyone insists that the whole thing was likely a scam, which she refuses to consider.

Olivia then makes her exit after she continues to claim to Oliver and Christian that she is going to become a big star in Hollywood. After she gives a movie-like performance, she walks out of the NoLimits with her suitcases behind her in hand. Thinking she is on her way to something bigger, she overlooks a foundation ditch and falls right into it and is knocked unconscious. A truck then proceeds to dump a large load of cement on top of her, filling the hole completely, leaving the viewers to assume that Olivia was buried alive.  Later, as part of another story line Olli jokingly says he would send her an invitation to an upcoming event but can't because she has never given him her address in L.A.  This is the last time the character is mentioned in the programme.

References

Verbotene Liebe characters
Fictional models
Television characters introduced in 2006